Sir Robert Henry Norman  (30 January 1914 – 3 April 2007) was an Australian aviator and businessman, best known for establishing Bush Pilot Airways, which later became Air Queensland.

Born in Maryborough, Norman served in the Royal Australian Air Force during World War II, after which he settled in Cairns. He married Betty Merle Kimmins just 3 weeks prior to his WWII deployment. In 1952 he founded Bush Pilot Airways, and in 1958 he was awarded the OBE. 
Knighted in 1989, he had also tenaciously pursued the establishment of a Cairns campus for James Cook University.  Sir Robert and Lady Betty Norman contributed to many community organisations including the Cairns Regional Art Gallery (where one wing is named after Lady Betty) and the Coast Guard (with the "Sir Bob" vessel being named for him).

Sir Robert and Lady Betty had 5 children - Robert John ("Bob Jr), Betty-Ann, Wendy Joy, Julie Kristine and Lindy Jane.

Inducted into the Australian Aviation Hall of Fame in 2016 they note the following about his life:
Sir Robert ‘Bob’ Henry Norman was known for pioneering work in aviation, founding Bush Pilots Airways and offering his services as an honorary pilot for the Cairns Aerial Ambulance for a quarter of a century. His vision and determination brought passenger services to regional, rural and remote communities Queensland post World War II – a legacy which is still being felt today.

Born at Maryborough in Queensland on 30 January 1914, Sir Robert was six years old when his fascination with flight and aviation began. In 1920, a plane arrived at Maryborough, carrying a press reporter who was covering the Royal visit by the then Prince of Wales – later to be crowned Edward VIII.

Eight years later, Bert Hinkler flew into Maryborough. He had just completed the first solo flight from England to Australia. Already intrigued by the notion of flight, Sir Robert was drawn to the excitement and heroism which surrounded the pioneering aviators of the era.

After the death of his father when Sir Robert was 16, the family moved to Cairns. He worked at the local brewery for several years, initially as a cask washer and then as a cellarman. It was during this time he met Betty Kimmins, who was later to become his wife.

When World War II began in 1939, Sir Robert in his words “kept out of it until 1941 when our army was caught in Greece and Crete and thousands taken prisoner”. He joined the Royal Australian Air Force (RAAF) and attended the Initial Flying Training School at Archerfield and the Elementary Flying Training School at Narromine.

He married Betty while on leave before heading initially to Canada for Service Flying Training. Sir Bob later said he got the idea for Bush Pilots whilst in Canada after reading a local newspaper article about the pilots who flew to remote areas in that country.

After further service flying training in England, Sir Robert was despatched to No. 75 Operational Training Unit RAF (75 OTU) in Egypt, which had been formed in December 1942 to train general reconnaissance crews using the Lockheed Hudson. Halfway through his training, the Unit switched to Venturas.

On completing training, he and his crew joined 459 RAAF Squadron operating in the Mediterranean. He served in this squadron with distinction, rising to the rank of flight lieutenant.

At the end of his wartime service, Sir Robert returned to Cairns and with Betty and his two brothers, established a dry-cleaning business. However, his passion for aviation remained strong. During his years of service, he had thought often of establishing his own company, “Bush Pilots”. Determined to see that dream become a reality, he gained a Commercial Pilot's Licence.

In 1947, Sir Robert helped establish the North Queensland Aero Club, along with Frank and Neville Mitchell and Liana Sugden. The Club initially had one serviceable Tiger Moth and two crashed Tigers, which the members built up. The Tiger Moths were also used by the club's pilots to provide support to Cairns Aerial Ambulance.

It was a call out to a medical emergency on a cattle station west of Charters Towers in 1951 which set in train the realisation of Sir Robert's dream. Vera Anning, the wife of grazier Bev Anning, had miscarried. Sir Robert flew one of the Tiger Moths to the station to airlift Vera to hospital, but the flight back to Cairns was delayed for several days due to bad weather. It was during this delay that Sir Robert and Bev Anning discussed the need for an outback emergency air service with an aircraft more suitable for carrying patients.

Anning suggested an arrangement whereby graziers would put up the money and the North Queensland Aero Club would provide the aircraft and crews.

On returning to Cairns, Sir Robert discussed the idea with his solicitor, Jack Bell, who advised a limited liability company would be a better option. A prospectus was drawn up and Bush Pilots Airways began to take shape. Sir Robert, Jack Bell and Neville Mitchell were the first three shareholders.

Its first aircraft was a De Havilland DH-90 “Dragonfly” which was purchased from Adastra Airways Ltd in Sydney. Sir Robert flew it to Cairns on 19 June 1951 and it went into operation on 23 June of that same year. By the late 1950s, it had 11 four-seat Auster Autocars serving isolated settlements and properties across Cape York Peninsula, North West Queensland and Gulf Carpentaria Queensland.

It opened up much-needed air links between Cairns and the small communities of Far North Queensland, keeping them supplied when the wet season cut the roads. By From its humble start with one aircraft, Bush Pilots Airways Limited grew to become a major regional carrier in Northern Australia. Sir Robert spent 15 years at the helm of Bush Pilots and acted as an honorary pilot for the Cairns Aerial Ambulance for 25 years.

In 1958, he was appointed an Officer of the Most Excellent Order of the British Empire (OBE) for his work in preventing loss of lives during and after Cyclone Agnes, which devastated much of Far North Queensland in March 1956. He was created a Knight Bachelor in 1989 in recognition of his outstanding community service.

He also had a long association with James Cook University, advocating for the establishment of a Cairns campus. He received an honorary Doctor of Letters from James Cook University.  The Tropical Research facility "Australian Tropical Herbarium" (Building E2) at Cairns Campus of James Cook University at Smithfield is named in honour of Sir Robert due to his commitment to bringing the University to Cairns.

Sir Robert passed away in Cairns on 3 April 2007 at the age of 93. As a tribute, the North Queensland Warbirds performed a flyover of the Cairns Esplanade following the funeral service.

In the Author's Note for his book, Bush Pilot (1976), Sir Robert wrote about being a bush pilot:

"… the greatest satisfaction of all was the realisation of doing something for others, and there was probably no other vocation in the world which offered more opportunities for giving service to our fellow men."

References

1914 births
2007 deaths
Australian Knights Bachelor
Australian Officers of the Order of the British Empire